Karri Pekka Matias Miettinen (born April 21, 1978), better known by his stage name Paleface, is a Finnish hip hop musician.

Discography

Albums 
 The Pale Ontologist (2001)
 Quarter Past (2003)
 Studio Tan (2007)
 Helsinki–Shangri-La (2010)
 Palaneen käryä (2011)
 Maan tapa (2012)
 Food for the Gods (2013) with Matre
 Luova tuho (2014)

Singles 
 "The Ultimate Jedi Mind Trick – Episode IV" (2000)
 "Back to Square One" (2000)
 "Maximize the Prophet" (2001)
 "Keep Hope a Lie" (2001)
 "Til' the Break of Dawn" (2003)
 "Colgate Soulmate" (2003)
 "Hellsinki Freezes Over" (2007)
 "Gently" (2007)
 "Merkit" (2010)
 "Talonomistaja" (2010)
 "Syntynyt rellestää" (2010)
 "Helsinki–Shangri-La" (2010)
 "Ikivanhat tekosyyt"
 "Miten historiaa luetaan?" (2012)
 "Muista!" feat. Redrama and Tommy Lindgren (2012)
 "Food for the gods" (2013)
 "Mull' on lupa" (2014)
 "Snaijaa" feat. Tuomo  (2014)
 "Palamaan (Pahan Kukat)" (2016)
 "Emme Suostu Pelkäämään (Loldiers Anthem)" (2016)
 "Eteenpäin" feat Iso H, Prinssi Jusuf and Jepa Lambert (2017)

References

External links 

 Paleface on Myspace

 
1978 births
Living people